The following is a list of caricatures published by the British magazine Vanity Fair (1868–1914).

Caricatures 
List of Vanity Fair (British magazine) caricatures (1868–1869)
List of Vanity Fair (British magazine) caricatures (1870–1874)
List of Vanity Fair (British magazine) caricatures (1875–1879)
List of Vanity Fair (British magazine) caricatures (1880–1884)
List of Vanity Fair (British magazine) caricatures (1884–1889)
List of Vanity Fair (British magazine) caricatures (1890–1894)
List of Vanity Fair (British magazine) caricatures (1895–1899)
List of Vanity Fair (British magazine) caricatures (1900–1904)
List of Vanity Fair (British magazine) caricatures (1905–1909)
List of Vanity Fair (British magazine) caricatures (1910–1914)

Artists

Categories

 
Caricature
Lists of mass media in the United Kingdom
Lists of magazines published in the United Kingdom
Vanity Fair
Vanity Fair
Lists of cartoons